Benjamin Long (March 7, 1838 – June 23, 1877) was a Swiss-born grocer and immigrant to Texas, where he served as Mayor of Dallas between 1868–70 and 1872–74.

Biography
Benjamin Long was born March 7, 1838, in Zürich, Switzerland. He married Eugenia De Vleschondere, an immigrant from Belgium, on 25 March 1862 at the home of Jacob Nussbaumer in Dallas, Texas. They had one son and four daughters.

He emigrated as part of the La Réunion Colony, a utopian community which failed in part because most of the settlers were skilled craftsmen rather than farmers. Many of the settlers moved into east Dallas.  It was then that Lang changed the spelling of his name to Long.

During the American Civil War, he supported the Union, but moved to Mexico to avoid becoming involved in the hostilities. Following the Civil War, he was appointed mayor of Dallas by the military government in Austin for the term 1868–1870. He became a naturalized citizen in 1869. He resigned as mayor in April 1870 to return to Switzerland where he encouraged immigration to Texas. He was re-elected for a two-year term 1872–1874, but was defeated for re-election in 1874.

Long provided funds for the right of way for the Texas and Pacific Railway and helped to secure land for the construction of the depot during his second term in office. He also built an artificial recreation lake, Long's Lake. He was a member of the Tannehill Lodge #52 A.F. and A.M.

On  June 23, 1877, Benjamin Long was shot by a patron of a Dallas saloon who had not paid his bar bill. He was interred at Greenwood Cemetery, Dallas, Texas.

References

1838 births
1877 deaths
1877 murders in the United States
19th-century American politicians
Deaths by firearm in Texas
Mayors of Dallas
Murder in Dallas
Politicians from Zürich
People murdered in Texas
Male murder victims
Swiss emigrants to the United States